The Black Abolitionist Papers Project was an archival research project conducted to document the work of Black abolitionists in the United States. The project was supported by the National Endowment for the Humanities from 1976 to 1992. The project ultimately resulted in the Black Abolitionist Papers collection at the US National Archives and Records Administration.

Bibliography
 Ripley, C. Peter, ed. The Black Abolitionist Papers: Volume I: The British Isles, 1830–1865 (U North Carolina Press, 1985) online Ripley, C. Peter, ed. The Black Abolitionist Papers: Volume II: Canada, 18830–1865 (1985) online

 Ripley, C. Peter, ed. The Black Abolitionist Papers. Volume III: The United States, 1830-1846 (1991)
 The Black Abolitionist Papers, Volume IV: The United States, 1847-1858 (1991)
 The Black Abolitionist Papers, Volume V: The United States, 1859-1865''  (1992)

See also
 List of African-American abolitionists

External links
 The Black Abolitionist Papers, University of North Carolina Press

References

Research projects
Pre-emancipation African-American history
African-American abolitionists
National Endowment for the Humanities
National Archives and Records Administration